Bódi Guszti (born December 12, 1958 in Nagyecsed, Hungary) is a Lovari Romani, Gypsy, Hungarian musician, composer and singer. Also member of the Hungarian royal family: the Hunyadiak

Biography

He started performing, singing and playing piano early in his childhood. He married his love Margó at the age of 18.
He formed his group, Nagyecsedi Fekete szemek, in 1978. In English this translates as Black Eyes from Nagyecsed. At that time it was a 22-member dance ensemble.

In 1987 Guszti and Margó decided to move their family to Budapest to establish and create the so-called "pop-gypsy" music, which was a lighter more entertaining style than their earlier Roma music. With the release of their album "Szeretlek, Szeretlek" (I love you, I love you) in 2000 they finally became famous and popular all over Hungary
Over the years the group acquired 14 gold, and 8 platinum awards.
Guszti often performs with other Hungarian entertainers like Lagzi Lajcsi, Kozsó, and others.

His group Fekete szemek (Black Eyes) is entirely family structured i.e. his two sons Csaba and Guszti Jr. virtually grew up with the group and became part of it as soon as they could. They are still performing with great popularity all over Hungary and other countries.

Members of "Bódi és a Fekete szemek"

 Bódi Guszti, vocal, composer
 Bódi Margó, vocal, lyrics
 Bódi Csaba, vocal, milk-bucket drum
 Bódi Guszti Jr., vocal, guitar

List of Albums

1992 Aranyalbum ( válogatás), (Golden album of selected songs)
1995 Háj Romalé, (Hey Romale)
2000 Szeretlek, Szeretlek, (I love you, I love you) - double platinum
2000 Kalapom, Kalapom, (My hat, My hat)
2001 Bilincs a szivemen, (Handcuffs on my heart)
2002 Egy bűnöm van, (I have only one sin...)
2002 Bulizzunk ma együtt, (Let's party together tonight)
2003 Aranyos hintó, (My golden chariot)
2004 Nem én lettem hűtlen, (It wasn't me who was unfaithful)
2004 Roma Sztárparádé No. 1, Bódi Guszti és barátai. (Roma Celebrity Parade No. 1, Bódi Guszti and his friends)
2005 Roma Sztárparádé No. 2, (Roma Celebrity Parade#2)
2005 Rabolj el mégegyszer, (Abduct me again)
2006 Roma Sztárparádé No. 3, (Roma Celebrity Parade#3)
2007 Forr a vérem, (My blood is boiling)
2007 Bódi Guszti CD válogatás, (CD selections of Bódi Guszti)
2008 Roma Rómeo
2009 Őszi eső, (Autumn rain)
2011 Fájdalom nélkül, (Without pain)
2012 Hosszú rögös út, (Long bumpy road)

References

External links
 (in Hungarian)
 

1958 births
Living people
Lovara
Hungarian Romani people
Hungarian songwriters
21st-century Hungarian male singers
Romani musicians
20th-century Hungarian male singers